Mediocalcar pygmaeum is an epiphytic species of orchids in the genus Mediocalcar that is endemic to New Guinea. It has red, orange or orange-yellow coloured flowers with yellow, yellowish green or green tips. The pseudobulbs are a yellowish green colour with olive-green leaves.

Distribution and habitat

References

External links
 

Flora of New Guinea
Orchids of Australasia
Eriinae
Endemic flora of New Guinea